1979 ACC tournament may refer to:

 1979 ACC men's basketball tournament
 1979 ACC women's basketball tournament
 1979 Atlantic Coast Conference baseball tournament